Aghajari County is in Khuzestan province, Iran. The capital of the county is the city of Aghajari. At the 2006 census, the region's population (as Julaki Rural District of Behbahan County and Aghajari Rural District and Aghajari city of Omidiyeh County) was 21,087 in 4,465 households. The following census in 2011 counted 21,095 people in 5,391 households. At the 2016 census, the newly formed Aghajari County's population was 17,654 in 4,961 households.

Administrative divisions

The population history and structural changes of Aghajari County's administrative divisions over three consecutive censuses are shown in the following table. The latest census shows two districts, three rural districts, and one city.

References

 

Counties of Khuzestan Province